The Deerfield Correctional Center  is a state prison for men located in Capron, Southampton County, Virginia, owned and operated by the Virginia Department of Corrections.  The facility was opened in 1994 and has a working capacity of 1069 prisoners.  

It houses a special population of "Geriatric and Assisted Living Inmates":  elderly, infirm, disabled and other special-needs prisoners. The number of elderly prisoners has increased in Virginia's inmate population since the Commonwealth's abolition of parole in 1994.  

The site is adjacent to Virginia's former Southampton Correctional Center, which was established in 1938 as an agricultural facility. By 1955 Southampton had developed as a campus that included a livestock operation, a cannery, and a sewage disposal facility. Through prisoner labor, the facility supplied 80% of its own food.  Southampton was closed in January 2009 and was demolished soon after.

References

Prisons in Virginia
Buildings and structures in Southampton County, Virginia
1994 establishments in Virginia